Charles Ernest Leonard Lyle, 1st Baron Lyle of Westbourne (22 July 1882 – 6 March 1954) was a British industrialist and Conservative Party politician.

Early life

He was born in London, the only son of Charles Lyle and his wife, Mary, née Brown. He was educated at Harrow School and at Trinity Hall, Cambridge.

Business

The family were major ship-owners who had diversified into sugar refining, and Leonard joined the firm in 1903, and became a director when his father retired in 1909. When Abram Lyle & Sons merged with Henry Tate & Sons in 1921 to form Tate & Lyle. He became a director of the new company, then chairman in 1928, and president in 1937.

Lyle is best known for leading the opposition to the post-war Labour Government's plans to nationalise the sugar industry. The campaign was fronted by a cartoon character, "Mr Cube", drawn by artist Bobby St John Cooper.

Sport
Lyle was a notable athlete who represented Great Britain at lawn tennis, competing the Men's Singles at the Wimbledon Championships in 1922, 1923, and 1924. He became chairman of the Lawn Tennis Association in 1932, having been the first chairman of the International Lawn Tennis Club from 1924 to 1927. He was also president of the Professional Golfers' Association from 1952 to 1954, and was elected a member of the Royal Yacht Squadron in 1952.

Politics

He was elected as Member of Parliament (MP) for the Stratford division of West Ham at the 1918 general election, but was defeated at the 1922 general election. He was returned to the House of Commons in 1923 general election for Epping, but stood down at the 1924 general election to make way for Winston Churchill. He did not stand again until 1940, when he was elected as MP for Bournemouth at an unopposed by-election, and held the seat until he was ennobled in October 1945 in Churchill's resignation honours list, having stood aside to make way for Brendan Bracken.

He was knighted in the King's Birthday Honours 1923,  made a baronet on 22 June 1932, and was ennobled on 13 September 1945 as Baron Lyle of Westbourne, of Canford Cliffs in the County of Dorset.

Arms

References

External links
 
 

1882 births
1954 deaths
Alumni of Trinity Hall, Cambridge
Conservative Party (UK) MPs for English constituencies
Conservative Party (UK) hereditary peers
English industrialists
English male tennis players
British male tennis players
Knights Bachelor
People educated at Harrow School
UK MPs 1918–1922
UK MPs 1923–1924
UK MPs 1935–1945
UK MPs 1945–1950
UK MPs who were granted peerages
Tennis people from Greater London
Barons created by George VI
20th-century English businesspeople